Shangyou County is a county in the southwest of Jiangxi province, bordering Hunan province to the west. It is under the jurisdiction of the prefecture-level city of Ganzhou.

Administration
The county executive, legislature, judiciary are at Dongshan Town, together with the CPC and PSB branches.

Shangyou County is divided to 5 towns and 9 townships.
5 Towns

9 Townships

Climate

References

Ganzhou
County-level divisions of Jiangxi